William Procter Matthews III (November 11, 1942 – November 12, 1997) was an American poet and essayist.

Life
Born and raised in Cincinnati, Ohio, Matthews attended Berkshire School and later earned a bachelor's degree from Yale University as well as a master's from the University of North Carolina at Chapel Hill.

In addition to serving as a Writer-in-Residence at Boston's Emerson College, Matthews held various academic positions at institutions including Cornell University, the University of Washington at Seattle, the University of Colorado at Boulder, and the University of Iowa.
He served as president of Associated Writing Programs and of the Poetry Society of America.
At the time of his death he was a professor of English and director of the creative writing program at City College of New York. A reading series has been named for him at City College of New York.  His sons are Sebastian Matthews and Bill Matthews.

Awards
During his 27 years as an author, Matthews received fellowships from the Guggenheim Foundation, and the National Endowment for the Arts. In 1980, Matthews was the poet in residence at The Frost Place in Franconia, New Hampshire, and in 1997 he was a recipient of the Ruth Lilly Poetry Prize.

Works
Matthews published 11 books of poetry, including Time & Money which won the National Book Critics Circle Award in 1996 and was a Lenore Marshall Poetry Prize finalist. Two posthumous collections have been released: Search Party: Collected Poems and After All: Last Poems. Frequent subjects in his writing are the early years of professional basketball and historical Jazz figures.

Matthews believed that poetry should have subject matter, so as to provide the substance needed for the art to fulfill its function.

Bibliography
 The Parataxic Mode: Concerning Defoe's Use of Irony in Moll Flanders (1966, MA Thesis, UNC)
 Broken Syllables (pamphlet, 1969)
 Ruining the New Road (1970)
 The Cloud (1971)
 Matthews' Compleat Palmistry (1971)
 Sleek for the Long Flight: New Poems (1972)
 Sticks and Stones (1975)
 Rising and Falling (1979)
 Flood (1982)
 Good (1983)
 A Happy Childhood (1984)
 Foreseeable Futures (1987)
 Sleek For the Long Flight (1988)
 Blues if You Want (1989)
 Curiosities (Poets on Poetry) (essays, 1989)
 Selected Poems and Translations, 1969-1991 (1992)
 The Mortal City: 100 Epigrams of Martial (translator/editor, 1995)
 Time & Money: New Poems (1996)
 After All: Last Poems (1998)
 The Poetry Blues: Essays and Interviews (ed. Stanley Plumley, 2001)
 The Satires of Horace (editor/translator, 2002)

References

Further reading
   (print and on-line)

External links
 Academy of American Poets: William Matthews
 An Interview with William Matthews (David Wojahn, James Harms)
 A Conversation with William Matthews (The Artful Dodge)
 Ohio Reading Road Trip: William Matthews
 "Poet Philip Levine Remembers Poet William Matthews", CCNY Podcasts

American academics of English literature
1942 births
1997 deaths
American tax resisters
Emerson College faculty
University of Colorado faculty
Cornell University faculty
University of Washington faculty
University of Houston faculty
University of Iowa faculty
Yale University alumni
University of North Carolina at Chapel Hill alumni
Berkshire School alumni
City College of New York faculty
20th-century American poets
20th-century American non-fiction writers